Colby Municipal Airport or Shalz Field  is on Kansas Highway 25, two miles (3 km) north of Colby, in Thomas County, Kansas.

The airport's page at the Kansas Department of Transportation Airport Directory lists the name as Shaltz Field, but that spelling is incorrect as per the Federal Register dated March 8, 2004.

Facilities
It has two turf runways: 12/30 is 2,660 x 90 ft (811 x 27 m) and 4/22 is 2,600 x 80 ft (792 x 24 m).

In the year ending September 18, 2021 the airport had 5,550 aircraft operations, an average of 15 per day: 99% general aviation and 1% military. In April 2022, there were 24 aircraft based at this airport: 21 single-engine, 2 multi-engine and 1 helicopter.

History
The Colby airport had commuter airline service in the late 1960s/early 1970s by Air Midwest with nonstop flights to Denver as well as flights to Wichita making stops in Great Bend and Hutchison, Kansas. Air Midwest used Cessna 402 aircraft.

References

External links 

Airports in Kansas
Buildings and structures in Thomas County, Kansas